Li Shikang is a Chinese serial killer who killed six people and wounded 17 others with letter bombs sent to medical staff whom he blamed for not curing his sexually transmitted disease.

Crimes
Li Shikang, frustrated by the fact that doctors upset him by dismissing his fears for his children while failing to cure him, sent his first bomb on February 18, 1999, disguised as a fruit box, to the house of doctor Xu, teacher of the University of Medicine of Sichuan Province. 

On October 6, 1999 he sent a bomb to doctor Chen; it exploded and killed Chen and two others at a clinic in Guangzhou. Two others were wounded. 

In the third explosion on October 24, 1999, he sent a bomb to Doctor Wu, who told Shikang that the disease could not be transmitted by everyday contact with his children. Two butlers were killed in the explosion, while Wu and 13 other people were wounded.

Arrest
Li Shikang was arrested after a joint operation by police in Zhuhai and Guangzhou through the detonators he used.

See also
List of serial killers by country

References

20th-century Chinese criminals
Bombers (people)
Chinese male criminals
Chinese serial killers
Male serial killers
Serial bombers